Durand is an unincorporated community in Greensville County, Virginia, United States. Durand is primarily a farming community along US 58 west of Emporia, and is the home of the Mecklenburg Electrical Cooperative, a local power company.

Notes

Unincorporated communities in Greensville County, Virginia
Unincorporated communities in Virginia